The mission of the Bay Area Holocaust Oral History Project (BAHOHP) is to gather oral life histories of Holocaust survivors, liberators, rescuers, and eyewitnesses. The project is developing and maintaining a catalogue database for public use. Their goal is to provide students, scholars, resource centers on the world, and the general public access to their archives.

BAHOHP seeks to counteract Holocaust denial, and believes that the alarming upsurge of hate crimes and intolerance makes the need to record these stories all the more urgent. The Oral History Project regards recorded personal testimony as a powerful antidote for Holocaust denial.

BAHOHP recently merged with the Holocaust Center of Northern California (HCNC) to form a single organization under the HCNC name.  This new organization creates a central resource in Northern California for Holocaust education and remembrance.

The collection 
Lani Silver and R. Ruth Linden* founded the Holocaust Media Project, predecessor of the Bay Area Holocaust Oral History Project, in 1983.  They co-directed the project until 1985. Silver was executive director from 1985 to 1997. Since then, the project has been headed by Anne Grenn Saldinger. Today, the project has some 1700 audio and video recordings of survivors, witnesses and children of survivors.  In addition, the collection contains close to a thousand transcripts and other materials.

 Shapiro, Eleanor, "Interviewing Survivors Stirs Author's Identity Issues," Jewish Bulletin of Northern California, November 26, 1993; Linden, R. Ruth, "Making Stories, Making Selves: Feminist Reflections on the Holocaust."  Columbus, OH: Ohio State University Press, 1993 [A Helen Hooven Santmyer Prize Winner].

Interviews
BAHOHP gathers a complete life story of the interviewee, focusing on details surrounding the Holocaust. The questions will vary according to the specific experiences of each individual.  The interviewer has an advanced degree in psychology or social work and experience conducting survivor interviews.

BAHOHP keeps a copy of each tape and sends the master and a duplicate copy to the United States Holocaust Memorial Museum in Washington, D.C. In addition, the interviewee is given a copy of his or her interview at the conclusion of the taping. R. Ruth Linden, Ph.D. donated copies of the original archives (1981–1984) to Yad Vashem, the Holocaust Martyrs' and Heroes' Remembrance Authority in Jerusalem, on 7 September 2007 through the Israeli Consulate in San Francisco.

BAHOHP has agreed to record the memories of SPK, AK, and Warsaw Uprising veterans. The Polish community are delighted to be working with the Jewish community on this project.

Examples of oral testimonies
Helen Farkas was born in Romania, as Helen Safa. She remembers the Hungarian occupation and growth of anti-Semitism very clearly. She was part of the death march, yet made a heroic escape. Helen married her pre-war fiance and left Romania shortly before it came under communist rule. Helen later moved into the San Francisco Bay Area and spent much of her time educating about the Holocaust.
Hurst Sommer is a Holocaust survivor. A German Jew, he escaped Germany with his family in 1938 to Shanghai, China, where he spent World War II in a Japanese internment camp.
Max Drimmer and Herman Shine were both born in Berlin and knew each other as small children. In 1939 they were both sent to Sachsenhausen, a concentration camp close to Berlin. Their lives remained intertwined as they survived and escaped the horrific realities of the Holocaust.
Gloria Hollander Lyon was born in 1930 in Nagy Bereg, Czechoslovakia, where her family owned a store. In 1938 Jews were forced to close all businesses. Gloria spent time in a local ghetto before being deportation to Auschwitz. While there, she was selected for the gas chamber, but escaped by jumping out of the truck . After several camps she was finally liberated. Gloria resides in San Francisco and is an active Holocaust educator.
Oskar Klausenstock was born in Ciesezin, a small town in Poland. He was 17 years old when the war started. His memories of the Holocaust are from a teenager's perspective. He tells of his experiences with such vividness and clarity. He is also a poet and has transformed many of his memories into beautiful poems.

See also
Holocaust survivors 
Holocaust
Oral History
Antisemitism

References

External links
Bay Area Holocaust Oral History Project
Hurst Sommer

Oral history
Organizations based in the San Francisco Bay Area
Jewish German history